Charles Wayland Bryan (February 10, 1867 – March 4, 1945) was an American businessman and politician who served as the 20th and 23rd Governor of Nebraska, and Mayor of Lincoln, Nebraska, and was the Democratic nominee for Vice President in 1924. He was the younger brother of Secretary of State William Jennings Bryan, who was the Democratic nominee for President in 1896, 1900, and 1908.

Early life

Charles Wayland Bryan was born in Salem, Illinois on February 10, 1867, to Silas Lillard Bryan and Mariah Elizabeth (Jennings) Bryan. Silas Bryan had been born in 1822 and had established a legal practice in Salem in 1851. He married Mariah, a former student of his at McKendree College, in 1852. Of Scots-Irish and English ancestry, Silas Bryan was an avid Jacksonian Democrat. He won election as a state circuit judge and in 1866 moved his family to a  farm north of Salem, living in a ten-room house that was the envy of Marion County. Silas served in various local positions and sought election to Congress in 1872, but was narrowly defeated by the Republican candidate. An admirer of Andrew Jackson and Stephen A. Douglas, Silas passed on his Democratic affiliation to his son, William, who would remain a life-long Democrat.  Charles' cousin, William Sherman Jennings, was also a prominent Democrat.

Charles was one of nine children of Silas and Mariah, the first three of their children died during infancy. He had four of whom lived to adulthood. Silas was a Baptist and Mariah was a Methodist.

Bryan attended both the University of Chicago and Illinois College in Jacksonville.  He married Elizabeth Louise Brokaw on November 29, 1892. They had three children.  Bryan worked as a tobacco broker and insurance salesman, farmed, and raised purebred livestock.

Career
Bryan moved to Lincoln, Nebraska in 1889,  and became business manager and political secretary for his brother, William Jennings Bryan. From 1901 to 1923, he was publisher and associate editor of his brother's newspaper, The Commoner. Elected to the Lincoln City Commission in 1915 and 1921, he also served as mayor of Lincoln, Nebraska from 1915 to 1917 (again from 1935 to 1937).

Bryan first ran for governor in 1916, though he lost in the primary to Keith Neville. Bryan was elected the Governor of Nebraska in 1922, and served from 1923 to 1925.  He was the Democratic vice presidential candidate in 1924, picked largely because of his name to serve as running mate to conservative easterner John W. Davis. The ticket was overwhelmingly defeated by Republican incumbent Calvin Coolidge and his running mate Charles G. Dawes.

He was an unsuccessful candidate for governor in 1926 and 1928.  He won in 1930 and 1932, and served from 1931 to 1935.  During his tenure, the state's economy flourished, state spending was limited, and taxes were reduced.  He was an unsuccessful candidate for the U.S. Senate in 1934, governor in 1938, the U.S. House in 1940, and governor in 1942.

Death
Bryan died on March 4, 1945, in Lincoln, Nebraska, and is interred there at Wyuka Cemetery.

Notes

References 

Bibliography

External links

 
 Encyclopedia of Nebraska
 Charles W. Bryan at National Governors Association

|-

|-

|-

|-

|-

|-

|-

|-

1867 births
1945 deaths
20th-century American newspaper publishers (people)
20th-century American politicians
Baptists from Illinois
Charles Bryan
Democratic Party (United States) vice presidential nominees
Democratic Party governors of Nebraska
Illinois College alumni
Mayors of Lincoln, Nebraska
People from Salem, Illinois
Candidates in the 1924 United States presidential election
1924 United States vice-presidential candidates
University of Chicago alumni